Óscar Nicolás Suárez León (born 13 April 1999) is an Uruguayan footballer who plays as a forward.

Career

Club career
Suárez got his official debut for Deportivo Maldonado in the Uruguayan Segunda División against C.A. Torque on 10 December 2016. He scored his first official goal for Maldonado on 6 July 2019 against Villa Española. Playing only 11 official games for Maldonado's first team, and the rest of the time, mostly for the U19s, Suárez left the club at the end of 2019.

In 2020, Suárez moved to fellow league club Rocha FC on loan for the whole year.

References

External links
 

Living people
1999 births
Association football forwards
Uruguayan footballers
Uruguayan Segunda División players
Deportivo Maldonado players
Rocha F.C. players
People from Maldonado, Uruguay